is Korean boyband Tohoshinki's twenty-seventh Japanese single and was released on April 22, 2009 by Rhythm Zone. This is their sixth number one single in Japan, extending the record they set back in earlier in the year with "Bolero / Kiss the Baby Sky / Wasurenaide". The single has been labeled as a "One Piece single" since all three songs on the single at some point have been used as a theme song for One Piece.

Overview
"Share the World / We Are!" was released nearly a month after the release of their fourth Japanese studio album The Secret Code. "We Are! (Animation One Piece 10th Anniversary Ver.)" was used as the opening theme for anime series One Piece from episodes 373 to 394. "We Are!" is a cover of the first opening by Hiroshi Kitadani. "Share the World" took the place of "We Are!" as the opening theme of the series. The single debuted at number one on the Oricon charts giving the group their sixth number one single which extends their record making them the first foreign artist to have six number one singles in Japan. The bonus track , which was released in 2006, was used as the ending theme for the eight and half of the ninth season of One Piece.

Music video
The video begins with Hero dusting off a book and proceeds to open it. The members appear on a wasteland where the weather changes from sunny to rainy, when the first verse begins. At the start of the chorus the scene switches to a white background and near the end the wasteland fills with water and Hero emerges from it. At the start of the second chorus they are swimming under water and near the end of the video they are flying in the sky. In the end camera zooms out and shows the globe and reveals the title of the book, Share the World.

Live performances
June 20, 2009 - Music fair 21
July 1, 2009 - Tokudane Premium

Track list

Charts, peaks and certifications

Charts

References

External links
 Official website 

2009 singles
TVXQ songs
Oricon Weekly number-one singles
Songs written by Kenichi Maeyamada
2009 songs
Rhythm Zone singles
One Piece mass media
Anime songs